Alfons Vansteenwegen (born July 6, 1941) is one of the Flemish leading theoreticians and therapists in communication theory and important inspirator in the field of couple therapy and general psychotherapy.

External links 
 

Living people
Belgian psychologists
1941 births
Communication theorists